Lang may refer to:

Lang (surname), a surname of independent Germanic or Chinese origin

Places
 Lang Island (Antarctica), East Antarctica
 Lang Nunatak, Antarctica
 Lang Sound, Antarctica
 Lang Park, a stadium in Brisbane, Australia
 Lang, New South Wales, a locality in Australia
 Division of Lang, a former Australian electoral division.
 Electoral district of Sydney-Lang, a former New South Wales electoral division.
 Lang, Austria, a town in Leibniz, Styria, Austria
 Lang, Saskatchewan, a Canadian village
 Lang Island, Sunda Strait, Indonesia
 Lang, Iran, a village in Gilan Province, Iran
 Lang Varkshi, Khuzestan Province, Iran
 Lang Glacier, Bernese Alps, Valais, Switzerland
 Lang Suan District, southern Thailand
 Lang County, or Nang County, Tibet
 Lang, Georgia, United States
 Lang Chánh District, Vietnam
 Lang Trang, a cave formation located in Vietnam

Computing
S-Lang, a programming language created in 1992
LANG, environment variable in POSIX standard that sets multiple locale parameters
The LANG attribute in HTML, for identifying the language of content

Other uses
 "Langue", Ferdinand de Saussure's linguistic term for "competency" or "I-language" (both Chomsky), referring to a cognitive "language" as distinct from surface forms—natural spoken language
 Lang, variety of the jujube tree, whose fruits have a thicker skin compared to the fruits of other varieties
 Lang Film, a film and TV production company in Freienstein, Switzerland
 Lang Law, the informal name given to French law relating to book prices
 Lang Propellers, British company specializing in aircraft propellers
 Lang School, U.S. private school for gifted students, New York City
 Lang Syne Plantation, U.S. plantation near St. Matthews, Calhoun County, South Carolina
 Lang Van, a Vietnamese production company in Westminster, CA and Ho Chi Minh City
 Battle of Lang Vei, Vietnam War

See also
Lange (disambiguation)
Laing (disambiguation)